Krašči is a village in the Municipality of Cankova in the Prekmurje region of northeastern Slovenia. The Ledava River runs through the settlement and the reservoir created by the dam south of the village divides the village into two settlements.

István Kozel wrote a hymnal in the Prekmurje Slovene dialect in the 18th century in Krašči.

References

External links

Krašči on Geopedia

Populated places in the Municipality of Cankova